C4 is a grime MC from Birmingham, England. He's known for his songs "Off Track" and "Crazy Song", both of which were playlisted on BBC Radio 1Xtra.

Biography

C4's real name is Chanda Gerald from which he derived the C in C4. As a boy, C4 sang in his local church choir. His older brother is the garage producer Preditah.

In November 2011, C4 released "OoRITE Time", produced by Preditah. In 2012 he released "Off Track", along with a remix by grime crew Boy Better Know that features JME, Jammer and Frisco. In September 2012 C4 released "Crazy Song", with production by Mike Delinquent. In 2015, C4 released the major tune Go back featuring JME.

C4 appears frequently on the BBC's digital radio station, 1Xtra.

He is related to Chrysie 'Tam' Gerald, an upcoming urban gospel singer/songwriter.

References

 "On the Come Up" - October Edition ASCAP 13 November 2012

Living people
Grime music artists
Year of birth missing (living people)